Arthur John Gray was an athlete who competed for England.

Athletics career
He competed for England in the high jump and triple jump at the 1934 British Empire Games in London. He was the 1931 high jump AAA champion and 1932 triple jump AAA champion.

References

English male high jumpers
Athletes (track and field) at the 1934 British Empire Games
English male triple jumpers
Commonwealth Games competitors for England